Brantley is a city in Crenshaw County, Alabama, United States. Brantley is also commonly known as a speed trap town  by the locals of Alabama.  At the 2020 census, the population was 825. Brantley was incorporated in 1891 as a city.

Geography
Brantley is located in southern Crenshaw County at 31°35'4" North, 86°15'24" West (31.584365, −86.256651).

The town is located on high ground north of the Conecuh River.

Demographics

As of the census of 2000, there were 920 people, 406 households, and 261 families residing in the town. The racial makeup of the town was 59.35% White, 40.22% Black or African American and 0.43% Native American.  0.11% of the population were Hispanic or Latino of any race.

There were 406 households, out of which 28.8% had children under the age of 18 living with them, 38.2% were married couples living together, 23.2% had a female householder with no husband present, and 35.5% were non-families. 34.5% of all households were made up of individuals, and 19.7% had someone living alone who was 65 years of age or older.  The average household size was 2.27 and the average family size was 2.90.

In the town, the population was spread out, with 24.9% under the age of 18, 5.9% from 18 to 24, 27.0% from 25 to 44, 21.5% from 45 to 64, and 20.8% who were 65 years of age or older.  The median age was 40 years. For every 100 females, there were 73.3 males.  For every 100 females age 18 and over, there were 63.7 males.

The median income for a household in the town was $21,574, and the median income for a family was $30,078. Males had a median income of $26,063 versus $20,000 for females. The per capita income for the town was $14,108.  About 18.8% of families and 24.6% of the population were below the poverty line, including 33.5% of those under age 18 and 25.6% of those age 65 or over.

Education
Brantley Public Schools are part of the Crenshaw County School District. Schools in the district include Luverne High School, Highland Home School and Brantley High School. 
Mr. Dodd Hawthorne is the superintendent .

Confederate monument
In August 2017, a new Confederate monument was installed in the Confederate Veterans Memorial Park in Brantley.

Gallery

Climate
The climate in this area is characterized by hot, humid summers and generally mild to cool winters.  According to the Köppen Climate Classification system, Brantley has a humid subtropical climate, abbreviated "Cfa" on climate maps.

Notable residents
Chuck Person, basketball player
Wesley Person, basketball player
Wesley Person Jr., basketball player

References

External links
Town of Brantley official website

Towns in Crenshaw County, Alabama
Towns in Alabama
1891 establishments in Alabama